Campbell Creek is a stream in the U.S. state of South Dakota.

History
Campbell Creek has the name of Gen. Charles T. Campbell, a pioneer who settled near the stream.

See also
List of rivers of South Dakota

References

Rivers of Charles Mix County, South Dakota
Rivers of South Dakota